Michael Arthur Bass, 1st Baron Burton, KCVO (12 November 1837 – 1 February 1909), known as Sir Michael Arthur Bass, 1st Baronet, from 1882 to 1886, was a British brewer, Liberal politician and philanthropist. He sat in the House of Commons from 1865 to 1886 when he was raised to the peerage as Baron Burton.

Career
Bass was born at Burton upon Trent, the elder son of Michael Thomas Bass and the great-grandson of William Bass, the founder of the brewery firm of Bass & Co in Burton who moved there from London in 1777. His mother was Eliza Jane, daughter of Samuel Arden. Bass was educated at Burton Grammar School, Harrow and Trinity College, Cambridge. He was a Director of the family firm of Bass, Ratcliff, Gretton and Co from 1863, and Chairman of the Directors upon his father's death in 1884. He also served as a Member of Parliament for Stafford from 1865 to 1868, East Staffordshire from 1868 to 1885 and for Burton from 1885 to 1886. As a brewer, it was uncomfortable to be a Liberal MP as there was a strong temperance element to the Liberal Party at the time.

In 1882, he was created a Baronet, of Stafford in the County of Stafford, chiefly in honour of his father (who was still alive at the time and who had declined every honour offered to him) and with remainder to his brother Hamar Alfred Bass. Four years later, in 1886, he was raised to the peerage as Baron Burton, of Rangemore and of Burton-on-Trent in the County of Stafford, with remainder to heirs male. In 1897, he was created Baron Burton, of Burton-on-Trent and of Rangemore in the County of Stafford, with remainder, in default of male issue, to his daughter and her male issue. In 1904, he was further honoured when he was made a Knight Commander of the Royal Victorian Order.

Lord Burton married Harriett Georgina, daughter of Edward Thornewill (one of the family behind the Thornewill engineering company in Burton), in 1869. He died in London in February 1909, aged 71. He was succeeded in the baronetcy according to the special remainder by his nephew William while the barony of 1886 became extinct. The peerage of 1897 passed according to the special remainder to his daughter Nellie Lisa. The widowed Lady Burton lived with her daughter in Grosvenor Square. She died in 1931.

The Bass family seat was at Rangemore near Burton. King Edward VII visited Rangemore, the town and Bass Brewery in February 1902. It was Michael who got involved in creating the Stapenhill viaduct including a 120 ft cast iron suspension bridge, which was seen as an act of practical philanthropy, for the workers for when the river flooded it allowed the workers to still reach work via the canal.

Like his father, Michael Arthur Bass was a generous benefactor to Burton, making many fine contributions to the town, including the Ferry Bridge, Burton, the St Paul's Institute and Liberal Club (now the Town Hall) and St Chad's Church. A bronze statue of Lord Burton, sculpted by F. W. Pomeroy, was erected in front of Burton upon Trent Town Hall in 1911.

See also 
Beerage

References

Further reading

External links 

|-

|-

1837 births
1909 deaths
People educated at Harrow School
Alumni of Trinity College, Cambridge
English brewers
1
English philanthropists
Knights Commander of the Royal Victorian Order
Bass, Michael
Bass, Michael
Bass, Michael
Bass, Michael
Bass, Michael
Bass, Michael
People from Burton upon Trent
Bass, Michael
Bass, Michael
Peers of the United Kingdom created by Queen Victoria
19th-century English businesspeople